Charlotte Elisabeth Wust (1 November 1913 – 31 March 2006) was a German housewife of a German banking accountant and soldier during World War II. She is known for her tragic love story involving a lesbian relationship with Felice Schragenheim. The story of the relationship between Schragenheim and Wust is portrayed in the 1999 film Aimée & Jaguar, and in a book of the same name by Erica Fischer (:de: Erica Fischer).

She was declared Righteous Among the Nations on 31 August 1995 by Yad Vashem for her efforts to rescue Jewish women and shield them from Nazi persecution during World War II.

World War II and the rescue of Jewish women from Nazi persecution 
Residing in Berlin-Schmargendorf with her four children and a housekeeper during the early 1940s while her husband was away at war, Elisabeth Wust was introduced by her housekeeper to a woman named Felice Schragenheim (alias Felice Schröder). After spending time with her and falling in love with her, Wust learned that Schragenheim was in need of protection from Nazi authorities due to her status as a member of the German Resistance and as a Jewish woman.

Their courtship was traditional, according to Kate Connolly, the Berlin correspondent for The Guardian US at the time of her 2001 interview of Lilly Wust. After their introduction, Schragenheim "would come to tea at Lilly's almost daily, bringing flowers and poems. In between, the two would write to each other." When Wust was hospitalized with dental sepsis in March 1943, Schragenheim "brought red roses every day.... On March 25, the two became 'engaged', signing written declarations of their love, which they sealed with a marriage contract three months later."

The couple had begun living together after Wust legally separated from her husband in 1942; they remained a couple until July 1944 when Schragenheim was reported to Nazi officials and captured by the Geheime Staatspolizei (Germany's Secret State Police unit known more commonly as the "Gestapo"). Arrested at the home she shared with Wust, Schragenheim was taken to the Schulstrasse transit camp in Berlin; held there until 4 September 1944, she was then deported to the Theresienstadt concentration camp in Czechoslovakia. Despite the danger, Wust made repeated visits to Schragenheim at Schulstrasse, and also attempted to arrange a visit with her at Theresienstadt, but was refused by the camp's commandant.

Just over a month later, on 9 October 1944, Schragenheim was transported to the Auschwitz concentration camp after being sentenced to death. She is believed to have died on New Year's Eve (31 December 1944), according to Yad Vashem historians, who have stated that "Wust had only been able to escape punishment [for hiding Schragenheim in her home] because she was the mother of four young children whose father was missing in action." Other historians have indicated that, sometime in December 1944, Schragenheim and others prisoners were sent by Auschwitz officials on a death march to the Gross-Rosen concentration camp and also possibly on a second death march to the Bergen-Belsen concentration camp. Although her exact fate was never able to be determined, a Berlin court issued a ruling in 1948 which set her death date as 31 December 1944.

As a result of her involvement with Schragenheim, Elisabeth Wust faced increased scrutiny and harassment by Nazi officials, and was required to check in with local police every two days after Schragenheim's arrest, but this increased danger only strengthened Wust's resolve to shield other women at risk of a fate similar to that being experienced by Schragenheim. After meeting Lucie Friedländer, Katja Lazerstein, and Dr. Rosa Ohlendorf three weeks before Christmas in 1944, Wust then began hiding those three women in an upper level of her Berlin home. All three of the rescued women went on to survive the war; however, Friedländer, having been so badly traumatized by her experiences, ultimately committed suicide.

Death and interment  
 More than sixty years after the death of her beloved, Felice Schragenheim, Elisabeth Wust succumbed to complications from old age. Following her passing at the age of 92 on 31 March 2006, she was laid to rest at Dorfkirche Giesensdorf (the cemetery of the Giesensdorf village church), in Lichterfelde (Berlin), Germany. Her gravestone also serves as a memorial marker for Schragenheim.

Legacy and honors 
During the early to mid-1990s, Elisabeth Wust sold the rights to the story of her love affair with Felice Schragenheim to Austrian journalist Erica Fischer, who studied Schragenheim's poetry and the couple's letters, researched the couple's lives further, and then wrote the 1994 book, Aimée & Jaguar: A Love Story, Berlin 1943, which was then adapted for the screen, becoming the 1999 film, Aimée & Jaguar. As of 2018, Fischer's book had been translated into 20 languages.

On 31 August 1995, Elisabeth Wust was declared Righteous Among the Nations by Yad Vashem for her efforts to shield Jewish women from Nazi persecution.

Interviewed in 2001, the 89-year-old Wust recalled her time with Schragenheim:

It was the tenderest love you could imagine.... I was fairly experienced with men, but with Felice I reached a far deeper under-standing of sex than ever before....There was an immediate attraction, and we flirted outrageously.... I began to feel alive as I never had before....She was my other half, literally my reflection, my mirror image, and for the first time I found love aesthetically beautiful, and so tender....Twice since she left, I've felt her breath, and a warm presence next to me. I dream that we will meet again - I live in hope.

References

External links

 Yad Vashem - The World Holocaust Remembrance Center: "The Righteous Among The Nations: Elisabeth Wust"

1913 births
2006 deaths
LGBT women
German Righteous Among the Nations
German LGBT people
Recipients of the Cross of the Order of Merit of the Federal Republic of Germany
Female resistance members of World War II
Housewives
20th-century LGBT people